Qlaiaa is a village in the Marjeyoun District in southern Lebanon. The inhabitants are mainly Maronite Christians.

Name
According to E. H. Palmer, the name means "the little castle".

History
In 1838, Eli Smith noted Qlaiaa's population as Maronite.

In 1870 Victor Guérin found the village to have 400 Maronite inhabitants.

Note that a birket is a pool of water.

See also
Catholic Church in Lebanon

References

Bibliography

External links 
 Qlaiaa, Localiban
Survey of Western Palestine, Map 2:   IAA, Wikimedia commons

Populated places in the Israeli security zone 1985–2000
Maronite Christian communities in Lebanon
Populated places in Marjeyoun District